Fryingpan Canyon, a valley in the Cookes Range, in Luna County, New Mexico.
Its mouth lies at 4715 feet (1437m), at its confluence with Starvation Draw.

References 

History of Luna County, New Mexico
Landforms of Luna County, New Mexico
Canyons and gorges of New Mexico
Cooke's Wagon Road